Candida antarctica is a yeast species in the genus Candida.

Candida antarctica is a source of important industrial enzymes. Immobilized Candida antarctica lipase can be used to catalyze the regioselective acylation of flavonoids or the direct acetylation with phenolic acids.

This species contains a lipase enzyme that is able to cleave ester bonds in PET plastic.

References

External links

antarctica
Fungi described in 1983